Jim Fernandez's Galema: Anak ni Zuma is a 2013 Philippine fantasy drama television series loosely based on the comic book Zuma created by Jim Fernandez and the 1987 film of the same name.

Developed by Ginny Monteagudo-Ocampo and directed by Wenn V. Deramas, Toto Natividad, and Alan Chanliongco, the series stars Andi Eigenmann, Matteo Guidicelli, Bryan Santos, Meg Imperial, Derick Hubalde and Sheryl Cruz. The series premiered on ABS-CBN's Kapamilya Gold afternoon block and worldwide on TFC from September 30, 2013, to March 28, 2014, replacing Dugong Buhay.

The series was streaming on YouTube.

Synopsis
Galema: Anak ni Zuma began with Galela (Sheryl Cruz), who was raped by Zuma (Derick Hubalde), which resulted in the child Galema (Andi Eigenmann). Galela thought that her child was dead. But, Isabel (Sunshine Cruz), Galela's sister, decides to keep her as her own child, though Galema is her niece.
 
Galema grew like a normal person despite carrying twin snakes on her neck. She hid them with her hair. Even though she is Zuma's daughter, she supports the police in trying to defeat Zuma. 
 
Isabel tries to ask Galela whether she supports Zuma and whether, if her child with Zuma had survived, would she accept her? Galela said no. This hurts so much for Galema knowing that she is Galela's daughter.
 
Morgan (Matteo Guidicelli), Galema's long time friend, proposes to Galema. Galema accepts. Gina (Meg Imperial), Galema's "sister" (she is really Galema's cousin), tries to seduce Morgan one night before the wedding. But, Morgan's loyalty for Galema prevails so he pushes Gina away.
 
When Morgan and Galema are almost officially husband and wife, they face a big obstacle because Galema's half-brother Dean (Kit Thompson), Zuma's son from another girl, and Zuma, go to the wedding to get Galema's twin snakes, because he thinks that he will become a normal person if he gets Galema's snake, but it is just Zuma's way to kill Galema.
 
Galela is surprised, because she sees Galema's snake with her own eyes. Galela then treats Galema poorly. Galema, longing for her mother's acceptance, does anything her mother wants, including leaving the house because Galela remembers what Zuma did to her everytime she sees Galema.
 
Galema gets pregnant. The doctor says that the fetus has a mysterious long creature surrounding the baby's neck. Galema gives birth to a baby boy and a snake. Morgan loves Ethan but cannot accept Sophia as she is a snake.

Meanwhile, Joseph (Bodie Cruz), proposes to Gina. Gina arranges a party at their house. Joseph, not knowing Galema has a snake child, thought that the snake would bite him. Because of his nervousness, he throws things at Sophia. Sophia bites him and he dies. Gina, due to her anger at Sophia, tries to kill Sophia and to burn her,
 
Galela is slowly accepting Galema in her life. But, Zuma's poison in her body prevailed, and she becomes Galema's biggest enemy.
 
At the end, Galema defeats Zuma (but not kill him because Zuma can't die), by putting all her poison in Zuma's body before returning it to him (she managed to behead Zuma in the past). After that, Galema still needs to face her mom. Galela swallows Galema, until Galema can't breathe in her stomach. But, Galela's love for her child Galema prevails. She stabs herself to let Galema out. Galela dies to save Galema.
 
An amulet can make Galema a normal person. However, she gives it Sophia.
 
Years later, Galema and Morgan's children grow up. At the swimming pool, Zuma appears to get Ethan (Lance Lucido), but before that, Galema shows up and challenges Zuma for a fight.

Cast and characters

Main cast
 Andi Eigenmann as Galema Carriedo-Villalobos/ Galema Castillo-Villalobos
 Matteo Guidicelli as Morgan Villalobos
 Bryan Santos as Lt. William Barredo
 Meg Imperial as Gina Castillo
 Derick Hubalde as Zuma

Supporting cast
 Sheryl Cruz as Galela Carriedo
 Sunshine Cruz as Isabel Carriedo-Castillo / Malena
 Carlos Morales as Philip Castillo 
 Cris Villanueva as Richard Alvarez
 Dante Ponce as Gen. Roger Barredo 
 Divina Valencia as Rosalinda Carriedo
 Lito Legaspi as Agustin "Gustin" Carriedo
 Joey Paras as Teacher Karlo 
 Kit Thompson as Dean Evangelista

Extended cast
 Karla Estrada as Bettina Barredo
 Tess Antonio as Yaya Deborah
 Rubi Ruiz as Emma "Lola Ems" Villalobos
 Boom Labrusca as Louie Villalobos
 Carmen del Rosario as Yaya Bebang

Recurring cast
 Tippy Dos Santos as Mindy
 Shey Bustamante as Karen
 Carla Valderrama as Beatrice
 Bodie Cruz as Joseph
 Frank Garcia as Bruce
 Lance Serrano as Steve
 Ronie "Atak" Araña as Bonjing
 Pia Moran as Pacita
 Rochelle Barrameda as Elena
 Eagle Riggs as Juni
 DJ Durano as Frederick Kazumi
 Ya Chang as Ken

Cameo appearances
 Max Laurel as Tatang Entong
 Bing Davao
 Dionne Monsanto as Jessica
 Simon Ibarra as Pepito Villalobos
 Lance Lucido as kid Ethan (finale episode)
 Patricia Coma as kid Sophia (finale episode)

Special participation
 Ejay Falcon as Sgt. Alexander Pagaran
 Hideo Muraoka as Taizo Orochi / Emperador Tenok
 Brenna Garcia as teen Galema Castillo
 Kazumi Porquez as young Galema Castillo
 Rhed Bustamante as young Gina Castillo

Reception 
Galema: Anak ni Zuma charmed TV viewers when it premiered last September 30, 2013, with a 16.6% national TV rating according to data of Kantar Media Philippines, beating Pyra: Ang Babaeng Apoy of GMA Network which only rated 8.3%. It peaked 20.0% on its fifth episode on October 4, 2013.

See also 
List of programs broadcast by ABS-CBN
List of telenovelas of ABS-CBN

References

External links 
 

ABS-CBN drama series
2013 Philippine television series debuts
2014 Philippine television series endings
Philippine action television series
Fantaserye and telefantasya
Live action television shows based on films
Television shows based on comics
Filipino-language television shows
Television shows set in the Philippines